Twinsburg Congregational Church is a historic church building on Twinsburg Public Square in Twinsburg, Ohio.

The Greek Revival building was constructed in 1848 and added to the National Register of Historic Places in 1974.

The religious community that would later erect the First Congregational Church in Twinsburg in 1848 originally formed in 1822, and the members worshipped in various places for nearly a quarter century. The populating of Twinsburg preceded the organization of the church people by only half a decade. The church members used to meet in personal homes and the superior level of the gristmill at Old Mill Road and Ravenna Road prior to 1822.  In 1822 the members congregated in a log school house constructed on the public square the same year.  For a time later on, the church met in a frame church and school on the square, but the building did not survive because town government representatives concluded construction on the town square was illegal.  In the 1830s another church building was constructed that was also near the square, but the current building in its present location was constructed in 1848. The charging for pews generated the funds to build the church, priced at $3,300.  The church experienced a problem with the steeple when wind caused it to detach around 1856 or 1857, but it was repaired.  People coming to church by horse constructed shelters for their animals at the back of the church's property, but these were dismantled in the mid-1920s and repurposed for storage.  Eventually an addition for classrooms in 1954 replaced the storage area.

References

External links

Official website

Churches completed in 1848
Churches in Summit County, Ohio
Congregational churches in Ohio
Greek Revival church buildings in Ohio
National Register of Historic Places in Summit County, Ohio
Churches on the National Register of Historic Places in Ohio